Reliability verification or reliability testing is a method to evaluate the reliability of the product in all environments such as expected use, transportation, or storage during the specified lifespan. It is to expose the product to natural or artificial environmental conditions to undergo its action to evaluate the performance of the product under the environmental conditions of actual use, transportation, and storage, and to analyze and study the degree of influence of environmental factors and their mechanism of action. Through the use of various environmental test equipment to simulate the high temperature, low temperature, and high humidity, and temperature changes in the climate environment, to accelerate the reaction of the product in the use environment, to verify whether it reaches the expected quality in R&D, design, and manufacturing.

Description 
Reliability is the probability of a product performing its intended function over its specified period of usage and under specified operating conditions, in a manner that meets or exceeds customer expectations. Reliability verification is also called reliability testing, which refers to the use of modeling, statistics, and other methods to evaluate the reliability of the product based on the product's life span and expected performance. Most product on the market requires reliability testing, such as automotive, integrated circuit, heavy machinery used to mine nature resources, Aircraft auto software.

Reliability criteria 
There are many criteria to test depends on the product or process that are testing on, and mainly, there are five components that are most common:
 Product life span
 Intended function
 Operating Condition
 Probability of Performance
 User exceptions

The product life span can be split into four different for analysis. Useful life is the estimated economic life of the product, which is defined as the time can be used before the cost of repair do not justify the continue use to the product. Warranty life is the product should perform the function within the specified time period. Design life is where during the design of the product, designer take into consideration on the life time of competitive product and customer desire and ensure that the product do not result in customer dissatisfaction.

Testing method 
A systematic approach to reliability testing is to, first, determine reliability goal, then do tests that are linked to performance and determine the reliability of the product. A reliability verification test in modern industries should clearly determine how they relate to the product's overall reliability performance and how individual tests impact the warranty cost and customer satisfaction.

See also
Reliability engineering

References 

Reliability engineering